The 2018 Rizal Crusaders season is the 1st season of the franchise in the Maharlika Pilipinas Basketball League (MPBL).

Key dates
 June 12, 2018: Regular Season Begins.

Current roster

Datu Cup

Standings

Game log

|- style="background:#fcc;"
| 1
| June 19
| @ Bulacan
| L 61–80
| Paul Santiago (13)
| Four players (6)
| Five players (2)
| Baliwag Star Arena
| 0–1
|- style="background:#fcc;"
| 2
| June 28
| Pasay
| L 81–87
| Eric Dela Cuesta (22)
| Marco Balagtas (6)
| James Patrick Abugan (5)
| Ynares Center
| 0–2

|- style="background:#fcc;"
| 3
| July 10
| Caloocan
| L 80–92
| Marco Balagtas (13)
| Mark Benitez (16)
| Dela Cuesta, Santiago (6)
| Batangas City Coliseum
| 0–3
|- style="background:#bfb;"
| 4
| July 19
| @ Laguna
| W 80–79
| Alvin Vitug (21)
| Benitez, Diputado (7)
| Chris Diputado (7)
| Alonte Sports Arena
| 1–3
|- style="background:#fcc;"
| 5
| July 31
| Mandaluyong
| L 51–65
| Dela Cuesta, Juanico (11)
| Mark Benitez (11)
| Alvin Vitug (3)
| Ynares Center
| 1–4

References

Rizal Crusaders Season, 2018